Norman Grimes (born January 6, 1998) is an American track and field athlete, who specializes in the hurdles. At the 2015 World Youth Championships in Cali, Colombia, he won the gold medal in the 400 m hurdles. He recorded the second-fastest youth time in history, behind the world youth record held by William Wynne. A few weeks later, Grimes won the 400 m hurdles at the Pan American Junior Athletics Championships in Edmonton, Alberta, Canada.

Personal life

Grimes comes from an athletic family. His mother was an athlete in college and his father played football in college. His four sisters are also athletes. Grimes overcame a foot fracture in 2017 and came back strong in 2018.

Personal bests

Personal bests are for senior hurdle height. At youth and junior competitions, lower hurdles are used.

References

1998 births
Living people
American male hurdlers
Athletes (track and field) at the 2019 Pan American Games
Pan American Games track and field athletes for the United States
Texas Tech Red Raiders men's track and field athletes